Seven Brothers may refer to:

 Seven Brothers (islands), the English name given to the group of small islands off the east coast of the horn of Africa, in the Dact-el-Muyun, Yemeni, section of the Bab-el-Mandeb strait
 "Seven Brothers", in Christian hagiography, the sons of Saint Felicity of Rome
 Seven Brothers (Seitsemän veljestä), the 1870 Finnish novel
 Seven Brides for Seven Brothers, a 1954 Hollywood musical and stage production 
 Calabash Brothers, the 1987 Chinese animation
 Seven Brothers (comic), a 2006 comic from John Woo and Virgin Comics
 Seven Santini Brothers, an international moving and relocation firm